Isabelle Blanc (born 25 July 1975) is a French snowboarder and Olympic champion. She won a gold medal at the 2002 Winter Olympics in Salt Lake City.

References

1975 births
Living people
French female snowboarders
Olympic snowboarders of France
Snowboarders at the 1998 Winter Olympics
Snowboarders at the 2002 Winter Olympics
Snowboarders at the 2006 Winter Olympics
Olympic gold medalists for France
Olympic medalists in snowboarding
Medalists at the 2002 Winter Olympics
21st-century French women